Hong Kong 97 is an unlicensed shoot 'em up video game developed and published by HappySoft, a doujin game developer, for the Super Famicom. It was released in Japan in 1995, being sold as cartridges and floppy disks. Designed by the Japanese game journalist Kowloon Kurosawa, who claims the game is a satire of the video game industry, Hong Kong 97 was made in two days with the help of his friend.

The game takes place in China in 1997, during the handover of Hong Kong from the United Kingdom. Facing increased crime rate due to immigration from Mainland China, the Hong Kong government hires Chin, a super-powerful relative of Bruce Lee, to kill the entire population of China. At the same time, the deceased Tong Shau Ping is resurrected by a secret project conducted by the Chinese government as an "ultimate weapon". After defeating Tong Shau Ping, the game is repeated indefinitely until Chin dies. Hong Kong 97 sold around 30 copies due to its underground bootleg release, and it has since gained a cult following for its notoriously poor quality. In retrospect, it is considered by critics and journalists to be among the worst games ever made.

Gameplay

The player controls Chin, who must shoot and evade the Chinese populace and police officers moving downwards from the top of the screen. When shot, the enemies explode in mushroom clouds, leaving behind a flashing corpse and items for instant death or temporary invincibility. After a while, cars start appearing from the sides, moving horizontally across the screen as obstacles. After thirty enemies have been defeated by the player, the final boss, the "ultimate weapon" Tong Shau Ping appears. Once he is defeated, the game repeats itself. The game shows static photos as the background, which alternate between pictures of Maoist propaganda, Guilin, the logo for Asia Television, the logo for Chinese Coca-Cola or Mao Zedong in monochrome.

Sporadically, a syringe appears as a power-up, which grants Chin temporary invincibility. The player has no health points: if Chin is hit by anything other than an item, the game is immediately over, unless Chin is under invincibility. The game over screen contains the superimposed words "Chin IS DEAD!!" in English and grammatically incorrect Chinese "" over a still graphic image of the dead body of a victim of the Bosnian War, dated to 1992. The game then goes to the credits (listing the Embassy of Canada as a cooperation partner) and back to the title screen.

Upon turning on the game, the first three measures of the chorus of an upbeat rock-style rendition of "I Love Beijing Tiananmen" can be heard, which loops indefinitely throughout the game. The game has no other music or sound effects. It can be played in English, Japanese or traditional Chinese.

Plot
Hong Kong 97 begins with a short cutscene which places the game around the transfer of sovereignty over Hong Kong in 1997. People from Mainland China (described in the English script as "fuckin' ugly reds" and in the Japanese script as "dirty people spitting sputum") started immigrating to Hong Kong, causing a large increase in crime rate. As a countermeasure, the Hong Kong government (represented in-game by the governor Chris Patten) hires Chin (portrayed by Hong Kong actor and martial artist Jackie Chan), an unspecified relative of Bruce Lee, to "wipe out" all 1.2 billion of the "red communists" in China. Meanwhile, a secret project in Mainland China has succeeded in resurrecting Tong Shau Ping as the "ultimate weapon". 

The Chinese translation of the game refers to Chin as "Mr. Chan", alluding to the fact that a picture of Jackie Chan was used to depict the character. The back of the insert of the game notes that Chin is a heroin addict.

Development
In January 2018, Yoshihisa "Kowloon" Kurosawa finally broke his silence on the development of the game to the South China Morning Post. He stated that his goal was to make the worst game possible as a mockery of the game industry. Since Kurosawa did not have much programming skill, he had an Enix employee help him out, with the game being made in two days. He later asked a friend with basic knowledge of English to translate the story into this language, as well as an exchange student from Hong Kong to translate it into Chinese. Kurosawa took the music, an audio clip from "I Love Beijing Tiananmen", from a second-hand LaserDisc he got in Shanghai Street, and the main character sprite, depicting Jackie Chan, was taken from a movie poster of Wheels on Meals, a 1984 Hong Kong martial arts film.

With the game completed, Kurosawa used a game backup device that could copy Super Famicom games onto floppy disks, which he found whilst wandering through the computer malls of Sham Shui Po. Due to game backup devices being illegal in Japan at the time, Kurosawa could only advertise his game through articles written under pseudonyms for underground gaming magazines. He set up a mail-order service to sell the game on floppy discs and cartridges, for ¥2,000 – ¥2,500 ($20–$25 in USD). It sold only about 30 copies, despite him having printed several hundred copies of the insert, which he later threw away. He eventually forgot about the game, until he became aware that it was gaining some unwanted attention in the late 2000s. Eventually, his Facebook account was discovered and was bombarded with questions about the game.

Reception
In an advertisement in the underground magazine Game Urara for another HappySoft title, The Story of Kamikuishiki Village, Hong Kong 97s poor quality is acknowledged, with the advert referring to the game as "dreadful" and "incomprehensible". It also claims that bootleg copies of the game were widely sold in Hong Kong and Bangkok.

In retrospective reviews, Hong Kong 97 was met with overwhelmingly negative reception, with many calling it one of the worst video games ever made. The game has garnered a "so bad, it's good" cult following in Japan, Thailand and Taiwan, and in the West after it became the subject of an Angry Video Game Nerd episode.

See also
The Story of Kamikuishiki Village, another game developed by HappySoft with controversial content

Notes

References

External links

1995 video games
1997 in Hong Kong
Alternate history video games
Anti-Chinese sentiment in Asia
Anti-communism in Japan
Cultural depictions of Bruce Lee
Cultural depictions of Deng Xiaoping
Cultural depictions of Mao Zedong
Discrimination in fiction
Doujin video games
Genocide in fiction
Homebrew software
Jackie Chan video games
Japan-exclusive video games
Multidirectional shooters
Obscenity controversies in video games
Parody video games
Political satire video games
Satirical video games
Single-player video games
Super Nintendo Entertainment System-only games
Unauthorized video games
Video games developed in Japan
Video games set in 1997
Video games set in Hong Kong
Video games with digitized sprites
Works about British politicians